José Paulo de Oliveira Pinto (born 26 March 1994), known as Zé Paulo, is a Brazilian football player who plays for Hồng Lĩnh Hà Tĩnh in the V.League 1.

Club career
He made his professional debut in the Campeonato Paulista for Corinthians on 6 February 2014 in a game against Bragantino.

On 15 December 2018, Zé Paulo signed with Leixões until 2020.

Achievements

Club
Đông Á Thanh Hóa
Vietnamese National Cup:
 Third place : 2022

References

External links

1994 births
Footballers from Rio de Janeiro (city)
Living people
Brazilian footballers
Brazilian expatriate footballers
Sport Club Corinthians Paulista players
Club Athletico Paranaense players
Clube Atlético Bragantino players
Rio Ave F.C. players
Leixões S.C. players
Académico de Viseu F.C. players
Associação Académica de Coimbra – O.A.F. players
Quang Nam FC players
Campeonato Brasileiro Série A players
Campeonato Brasileiro Série B players
Primeira Liga players
Liga Portugal 2 players
V.League 1 players
Association football midfielders
Brazilian expatriate sportspeople in Portugal
Brazilian expatriate sportspeople in Vietnam
Expatriate footballers in Portugal
Expatriate footballers in Vietnam